A girah (also geerah) was a unit of length in India and Pakistan approximately equal to 2.25 inches (5.715 cm).  After metrication by both countries in the mid-20th century, the unit became obsolete.

See also
List of customary units of measurement in South Asia

References

Units of length
Customary units in India
Obsolete units of measurement